Transmembrane protein 8B is a protein that in humans is encoded by the TMEM8B gene. It encodes for a transmembrane protein that is 338 amino acids long, and is located on human chromosome 9. Aliases associated with this gene include C9orf127, NAG-5, and NGX61.

Gene

Location 
Cytogenic location: 9p13.3
Located on chromosome 9 in the human genome. It starts at base pair 35,814,451, and ends at 35,865,518, and contains 19 exons. There are 13 transcript variants that are protein encoding, and the longest transcript variant is 790 amino acids long.

Expression 
Using information from NCBI's EST Abundance Profile page on TMEM8B, expression levels vary in 32 different human tissues. The highest levels of expression can be found in the brain, ovaries, prostate, placenta, and the pancreas. Expression levels are down regulated in some cancerous tissue, specifically nasopharyngeal and colorectal carcinomas. TMEM8B is expressed in all stages of development, including fetal stages, as low levels of expression are present in the fetal liver, brain, and thymus.

mRNA

Splice Variants 
TMEM8B has 13 known mRNA splice variants in humans: Refer to the table below. All 13 variants are protein encoding, and all contain 19 exons. 
 

The figure below from NCBI Gene depicts the chromosomal location of each isoform in comparison to TMEM8B.

Protein

Protein Analysis 
Protein analysis was completed on Isoform A.
TMEM8B isoform A is 472 amino acids long. The molecular weight is 36.8 kDa, and the isoelectric point is 6.773. There are 7 transmembrane domains, resulting in 52% of the protein to be within the plasma membrane. The C-charge> N-charge, and therefore the C-terminal end is on the inside. Transmembrane domains are conserved in most orthologs, including all mammals. Relative to other proteins, TMEM8B has higher than normal levels of K, Lysine, and L, Leucine. There are three repeating leucine-rich regions within conserved domains of TMEM8B, all 4 amino acids long. Leucine rich regions can result in hydrophobic interactions within themselves.

Secondary Structure 
Identifying the secondary structure is helpful in further analyzing the function of this protein. Alpha helices are the strongest indicators of transmembrane regions, as the helical structure can satisfy all backbone hydrogen-bonds internally. This is why the secondary structure of this protein is practical, as many of the alpha helices lie in the predicted transmembrane regions. Other key structures identified in this protein include extended strands, which are hypothesized to be important folding regions, and random coils, a class of conformations in the absence of a regular secondary structure.

Tertiary Structure 
I-TASSER predicted the 3D tertiary structure of TMEM8B, with strategic folding of the alpha helices and beta sheets. Although there are no high scoring hydrophobic segments of TMEM8B, that would usually be hidden within the interior of the 3D structure, the high amounts of Leuceine (L) amino acids in this protein creates hydrophobic interactions with itself, and these areas are predicted to be buried on the inside of the structure. Refer to the figure below to see a predicted tertiary structure.

TMEM8B highly resembles a tertiary structure that is similar to the Reelin protein, predicted by a 42% coverage and 14.79% identity. The Reelin protein has no transmembrane domains, and is mostly found in the cerebral cortex and the hippocampus, where it plays important roles in the control of neuronal migration and formation of cellular layers during brain development.

Homologogy

Orthologs 
The orthologs of TMEM8B were sequenced in BLAST and 20 various orthologs were picked. The orthologs are all multicellular organisms, and vary through mammals, rodents, birds, fish, amphibians, echinoderms, chordates, insects, and cnidarians. Refer to the table below. Time tree was a program that was used to find the evolutionary branching shown in MYA, and conserved domains of the genome were found and analyzed using ClustalW.

Paralogs 
One human paralog was found when this protein was sequenced in BLAST. It is 416 amino acids long, with 40% sequence identity, and 45% sequence similarity. Accision number for this protein is: NP_067082.2.

Divergence of TMEM8B 
In an evolutionary comparison of TMEM8B, one species from each group (ex. Mammals, birds, fish) was plotted to avoid overabundance of information on one graph. Also plotted the comparison of the quickly diverging cytochrome C, and slowly diverging fibrinogen. TMEM8B shows divergence somewhere in-between these two proteins.

Clinical significance 
TMEM8B shows lower expression rates in nasopharyngeal carcinomas, and expression is also down regulated in colorectal cancers. This gene also plays a negative role in an Epidermal Growth Factor Receptor (EGFR) pathway. It can delay cell cycle G0-G1 progression, and thus inhibit cell proliferation in nasopharyngeal carcinoma cells.

Mutations with this gene can be pathogenic, and cause chronic pain disorders, specifically erythromelalgia symptoms. Erythromelalgia is a rare condition that affects the extremities (hands and feet), and is characterized by intense, burning pain, severe redness, and increased skin temperature. Medications are available to reduce symptoms, however, there is no cure for this rare condition.

Interacting Proteins 
Two interacting proteins were found: EGF protein, and ATXN1L protein.

EGF plays a role in cell adhesion in nasopharyngeal carcinomas (TMEM8B also plays a role in these carcinomas). This protein is expressed on the cell surface as a glycoprotein, and ectopic induction of EGF can impair NPC cell migration and improve cell adhesion and gap junctional intercellular communication.

ATXN1L protein has a correlation with neurodegenerative disorders. Neurodegenerative disorders are characterized by a loss of balance due to the cerebellar Purkinje degeneration. Ataxia-causing proteins share interacting partners, a subset of which has been found to modify neurodegeneration in animal models. Interactome provides a tool for understanding pathogenic mechanisms common for neurodegenerative disorders.

References

Further reading

External links 
 
 
 ExPasy, Sibs bioinformatics analysis
 EMBOSS Needle Protein